Diamond FM (88.7 MHz) is a radio station in Ilorin, Kwara State, Nigeria. The station began operating on 22 December 2020.

In 2021, the launch of a sister television channel, Diamond TV, was announced.

References

External links 
 

Radio stations established in 2020
Radio stations in Nigeria
Privately held companies of Nigeria
2020 establishments in Nigeria